The Roman Catholic Diocese of Kayes is a diocese located in the city of Kayes in the ecclesiastical province of Bamako in Mali.

On Thursday, January 31, 2013, Pope Benedict XVI appointed the Reverend Father Jonas Dembélé, up until then serving (as a member of the clergy of the Roman Catholic Diocese of San in San, Mali) as a pastor and as secretary of the National Union of Priests of Mali, as the bishop-elect of the Roman Catholic Diocese of Kayes, in Kayes, Mali, succeeding Bishop Joseph Dao, who retired in 2011.

History
 June 12, 1947: Established as Apostolic Prefecture of Kayes from the Apostolic Vicariate of Bamako
 July 6, 1963: Promoted as Diocese of Kayes

Leadership
 Prefects Apostolic of Kayes (Roman rite) 
 Bishop Etienne-Marie-Félix Courtois, M. Afr. (1947.11.07 – 1963.07.06 see below)
 Bishops of Kayes (Roman rite)
 Bishop Etienne-Marie-Félix Courtois, M. Afr. (see above 1963.07.06 – 1978.07.11)
 Bishop Joseph Dao (1978.09.12 – 2011.06.11)
 Bishop Jonas Dembélé (2013.01.31 - present)

Jonas Dembélé 
The Rev. Fr. Jonas Dembélé was born on May 15, 1963, in Sokoura, Mali, in the Roman Catholic Diocese of San. After finishing primary and secondary school, he entered the Major Seminary of the Roman Catholic Archdiocese of Bamako, in Bamako, Mali, for courses in philosophy, and afterwards attended the Seminary of Koumi, Burkina Faso (in the Roman Catholic Archdiocese of Bobo-Dioulasso) for studies in theology. Bishop-designate Dembélé was ordained a priest on July 12, 1992. After ordination, he held the following positions: from 1992 to 1996: Vicar in the parish of Saint John Bosco of Touba, Mali; from 1996 to 2008: Pastor of the Cathedral of Notre Dame de Lourdes; from 2002 to 2008: Secretary General of the Union of the Clergy of the Roman Catholic Diocese of San and of the National Union of the Clergy of Mali (UPM); from 2008 to 2010: Studies at the Institute of Pastoral Theology Lumen Vitae in Brussels, Belgium, with a 'maitrise' in Practical Theology of Société et Dévelomment (Society and Development); since 2011: Pastor of the Parish of Yasso, Mali, which is under construction. He will be ordained a bishop and installed as Bishop of Kayes in separate ceremonies in the near future. (He was consecrated and installed on May 11, 2013.)

See also
Roman Catholicism in Mali

Sources
 GCatholic.org

Kayes
Kayes
Christian organizations established in 1947
Roman Catholic dioceses and prelatures established in the 20th century
1947 establishments in French Sudan
Roman Catholic Ecclesiastical Province of Bamako